Dohňany is a village and municipality in Púchov District in the Trenčín Region of north-western Slovakia.

History
In historical records the village was first mentioned in 1471.

Geography
The municipality lies at an altitude of 289 metres and covers an area of 28.752 km². It has a population of about 1753 people.

Genealogical resources
The records for genealogical research are available at the state archive "Statny Archiv in Bytca, Slovakia"

 Roman Catholic church records (births/marriages/deaths): 1865-1897 (parish A)
 Lutheran church records (births/marriages/deaths): 1784-1909 (parish B)

See also
 List of municipalities and towns in Slovakia

External links
 
 
https://web.archive.org/web/20080111223415/http://www.statistics.sk/mosmis/eng/run.html
Surnames of living people in Dohnany
https://web.archive.org/web/20080531070620/http://www.ckmtbdohnany.sk/

Villages and municipalities in Púchov District